Ephraim Wales Bull (March 4, 1806 – September 26, 1895) was an American farmer, best known for the creation of the Concord grape.

Biography
Ephraim Wales Bull was born on March 4, 1806, in Boston, Massachusetts. He was an apprentice for a goldbeater at a young age, and on September 10, 1826, he married Mary Ellen Walker of Dorchester. Complaining of lung problems, Bull moved to Concord, in 1836, settling with his wife on a farm next door to Amos Bronson Alcott.

In 1843, Bull began the deliberate process of breeding a grape that could thrive in the cold New England climate. By 1849, having planted 22,000 seedlings, he had created a large, sweet variety from a native species, which he called 'Concord', and by 1853 the grapes were for sale. However, within several years, competing growers had begun raising their own crops of Concord grapes, purchased from Bull for $5 per vine, and Bull saw little profit from the strain after the initial sales.

Bull was elected to the Massachusetts House of Representatives in 1855. In 1893, after a fall, he went to live in the Concord Home for the Aged, and died on September 26, 1895, aged 89. He was buried in the Sleepy Hollow Cemetery in Concord, with an epitaph reading, "He Sowed Others Reaped."

References
Specific

General
EPHRAIM WALES BULL PAPERS, 1825-1889 (BULK 1825-1864) – Concord Library
 Collins, Paul.  Banvard's Folly: Thirteen Tales of People Who Didn't Change The World.  Picador USA, 2001.

External links
 Ephraim Wales Bull article on page 37 of the book Ancient Middlesex with Brief Biographical Sketches

1806 births
1895 deaths
Farmers from Massachusetts
Members of the Massachusetts House of Representatives
People from Concord, Massachusetts
19th-century American politicians